Təzəkənd (also, Taza-Kend) is a village and municipality in the Salyan Rayon of Azerbaijan. It has a population of 2,965.  The municipality consists of the villages of Təzəkənd and Gomuşçu.

References 

Populated places in Salyan District (Azerbaijan)